Diasporangium is a genus of water moulds. It contains the single species Diasporangium jonesianum, described in 1936 by German mycologist Willy Höhnk. Known from the United States and Germany, where it grows in soil, D. jonesianum can cause root rot in various plants. It has a spherical oogonium up to 25 µm in diameter, with an oospore that almost fills the oogonium.

References

Peronosporales
Water mould genera
Monotypic eukaryote genera